Anne Hatchard is an Australian rules footballer playing for the Adelaide Football Club in the AFL Women's competition.

AFL Women's career
Hatchard was drafted by Adelaide with their eleventh selection and eighty-seventh overall in the 2016 AFL Women's draft. She made her debut in the thirty-six point win against  at Thebarton Oval in the opening round of the 2017 season. She missed the round four match against  at Fremantle Oval when she was omitted from the side. She was a part of Adelaide's premiership side which defeated  by six points at Metricon Stadium in the AFL Women's Grand Final. She missed one match during the season to finish with seven matches in her debut season. 

Adelaide signed Hatchard for the 2018 season during the trade period in May 2017.

Hatchard enjoyed a breakout year in 2019, showing an increased ability to compete in the midfield largely as a result of improved fitness. She attributed this development to a change in diet, specifically cutting down on fast food. Overcoming concussion concerns ahead of a thumping 66-point preliminary final victory against Geelong, she went on to play all nine games culminating in a second premiership with the Crows in three years. Gathering 24 disposals and kicking one goal on the day, Hatchard was recognised as a key performer in her club's 45-point grand final triumph over Carlton, placing second with just one vote less than team mate Erin Phillips in the award for best on ground. Her season was punctuated with a maiden All-Australian selection and a re-commitment to Adelaide by signing a two-year contract during the trade period.

The 2020 AFL Women's season saw Hatchard obtain her second AFL Women's All-Australian team selection, named on the interchange bench.

AFLW statistics 
 Statistics are correct to the end of the 2019 season

|- style="background:#EAEAEA"
| scope="row" text-align:center | 2017
|
| 33 || 7 || 0 || 0 || 20 || 22 || 42 || 9 || 9 || 0.0 || 0.0 || 2.9 || 3.1 || 6.0 || 1.3 || 1.3 || 0
|-
| scope="row" text-align:center | 2018
|
| 33 || 4 || 1 || 0 || 14 || 16 || 30 || 4 || 9 || 0.3 || 0.0 || 3.5 || 4.0 || 7.5 || 1.0 || 2.3 || 0
|- style="background:#EAEAEA"
| scope="row" text-align:center | 2019
|
| 33 || 9 || 3 || 1 || 60 || bgcolor="DD6E81" | 110 || 170 || 24 || 33 || 0.3 || 0.1 || 6.7 || bgcolor="DD6E81" | 12.2 || 18.9 || 2.7 || 3.7 || 0
|- class="sortbottom"
! colspan=3| Career
! 20
! 4
! 1
! 94
! 148
! 242
! 37
! 51
! 0.2
! 0.1
! 4.7
! 7.4
! 12.1
! 1.9
! 2.6
! 0
|}

References

External links 

1998 births
Living people
Adelaide Football Club (AFLW) players
Australian rules footballers from South Australia
Lesbian sportswomen
LGBT players of Australian rules football
Australian LGBT sportspeople
21st-century LGBT people